Orbessan is a commune in the Gers department in southwestern France.

Geography

Localisation 
Orbessan is located 13 km south of Auch and 6 km north of Seissan, along the Gers river.

Population

See also
Communes of the Gers department

References

Communes of Gers